Pommel may refer to:

 Coco Pommel, a character in My Little Pony: Friendship is Magic
 Pommel (saddle), the raised area at the front of an equestrian saddle
 Pommel (sword), the cap at the end of the hilt of a European sword

See also
 Pommel horse, an artistic gymnastics apparatus
 Pummel (disambiguation)